1998 JEF United Ichihara season

Competitions

Domestic results

J.League

Emperor's Cup

J.League Cup

Player statistics

Other pages
 J. League official site

JEF United Ichihara
JEF United Chiba seasons